The Kalinin K-9 was a liaison/sport aircraft designed by Konstantin Alekseevič Kalinin.  It had a parasol wing, only one was built in 1932.  The prototype was evaluated during some test flights, but development was never carried out.  The tests revealed that the K-9 was too large and too heavy in relation to the installed engine, ( Walter NZ 60).

Specifications (K-9)

References

Further reading

Kalinin aircraft